M. L. D. S. Priyadarshi Suriyasena Liyanage (Sinhala:ප්‍රියා සූරියසේන: born 27 October 1949), popularly as Priya Suriyasena, is a Sri Lankan singer. Priya first emerged as a talented local singer with the guidance of his father, who was a poet, and then rose to fame overnight when his first four songs were broadcast at the Sri Lanka Broadcasting Corporation (SLBC) in 1970's. Since then he has retained his fame over five decades and produced most popular songs in Sri Lanka such as Atha Ranviman, Mata Wasana, Adaraneeya Neranjana, Ratakin Eha and Sudu Paravi Rena.

Personal life 
Priya Suriyasena was born on 27 October 1944 to an up-country middle-class family in Nattandiya, Puttalam district, Sri Lanka. His father Jamis Appuhami was a poet, from whom he got his musical talents. His mother was A. M. Podi Manike. He was the only son in a family of four. He had his primary education at Nattandiya Primary School and completed his GCE O/L and A/L at Madampe Central College in Puttalam district.

In 1978 he married Thamara Kumari Weerasinghe who was also a music teacher. The couple has one son and three daughters. His son Luckshitha studied at Ananda College and learned music from Lionel Ranwala. Luckshitha pursued his PhD at Stanford University, USA and a scientist by profession. He is also a talented singer and performs on live TV to continue his father's legacy.  Eldest daughter Minoshi is a Doctor. The second daughter, Iroshi, is also active in the Sri Lankan music industry and works as a Senior Manager at a private bank. The youngest daughter Gayashi is still following higher studies.

Singing career 
Priya sat for external music exams conducted by the government musical college 'Heywood' from 1968 to 1971 and obtained a diploma in music. Priya has won several prizes as a student after participating in musical programs, such as island-wide UNESCO talent competition in which he won the first prize. Suriyasena also continued his career as a music teacher in Kelaniya Gurukula College in 1971 while he was also a stage singer. Then he moved to Kalubowila Vidyalaya and finally in Dehiwala Central College. After about 10 years of service in Dehiwala, Suriyasena left his teaching career giving priority to his music career.

Priya recorded some of his original songs in SLBC in 1972 and also passed as an A-grade radio singer. At this stage he shortened his name from Priyadharshi to "Priya", inspired by Sri Lankan Motor Racing legend Priya Munasinghe. His first cassette tape was released under Vijaya Ramanayake's Tharanga label, which was also the second cassette produced in Sri Lanka. His first song Andura Andura Mage was recorded in 1968. Lal Thenabadu, the late Sarath Dassanayake, Stanley Peiris, Sarath de Alwis, late Clarence Wijewardena Ranjith Perera and many other veteran music directors have composed his songs. Priya is also a talented composer and directed music for his own songs such as Adaraneeya Neranjana, Heta Dawase, Mata Wasana, Sanda Ma Gawai, Mage Samarum Pothe, Ekama Vidiye, and Gelawata Banda Wu etc. Most of these songs were created by Priya and Premakeerthi De Alwis who were close friends in the 1970's and became instant hits popular to date. He has also composed songs to other artists such as H.R. Jothipala, Milton Mallawarachchi, Mervin Perera, Anton Senanayake and famous Christian Baila music hit dedicated to St Anthony sung by Anton Jones. Priya has famous duets with Victor Rathnayake, Latha Walpola, Chandralekha Perera, Malkanthi Nandasiri etc.

After the release of his first four songs in SLBC Priya reached the peak of popularity and became the heartthrob of youngsters in the 1970s. His first four songs: Sarathasa Niwa, Mata Wasana, Heta Dawase and Andura Andura Mage were recorded for the SLBC in 1972. The release of Sudu Parevi Rena Se brought Suriyasena up to one of the top singers in the 1970s bringing a controversy at the time where the Sri Lankan government prohibited broadcasting the song through radio channels for a period of time. His popularity was raised with the Sarasaviya Award for Kendan Yannam, a song from Sena Samarasinghe's 1984 film Aethin Aethata with Milton Mallawarachchi and Gratien Ananda. 

He was also a play back singer in many films including Mal Kekulu in early 1980s, song Bindu Bindu Kandulu Sala, a duet with Shayami Fonseka and music directed by Sarath Dassanayake and produced by Sena Samarasinghe. Further, he sang in many other films like Selinage Walawwa, Mudukkuwe Juliet, Hariyanakota Ohama Thamai, and Pina Paduna Da. In the film Ethin Ethata, he sang the duet "Kandan Yannan Ranmal Mala Dala" with Milton Mallawarachchi to the music direction of Sarath Dassanayake which won a Sarasaviya Award in the 1980s. In the film Suhada Sohoyuro he played a minor role. However, later Suriyasena gave up singing as a play back singer focusing only on stage. In 2006 he sang a duet Gimhanaye with Samitha Mudunkotuwa for the film Kalu Sudu Mal as the male playback for Kamal Addararachchi.

At the beginning of 1990s Suriyasena was leaned towards cassette production business where he started "Luckshitha Trade Centre" and released cassettes of M.S. Fernando, Punsiri Soysa, H.R. Jothipala and Champa Kalhari. In 1996 priya brought a new musical generation to the country with the album "Sunflowers with Priya" which grossed revenue over Rs. 8 million and became the most sought after singer in the country again in 1990's. The trend with Sunflowers continued for decades after the first release. In 2009 he again rose to fame as the winners of the first reality superstar competition in Sri Lanka (Sirasa Superstar) sang his songs in the competition that later led to controversy. 

Priya has travelled overseas to countries with significant Sri Lankan communities for musical performances. His maiden foreign tour was to Singapore in 1978 with Nanda Malini, Sanath Nandasiri and Malkanthi Nandasiri. Subsequently, he made it to over 44 other countries including United States, Canada, Europe, Asia, Middle East, Japan and Australia.

In 2012, he released the album "Malsara Hinawa" which included several old hits. 

Priya Suriyasena's musical career spans five decades and he is still popular and active in Sri Lankan musical arena to this date.

References

External links
 තරු පායලා බැහැල ගියත්
 ඈත රන් විමන් ගී පද රචනය මගේ ප්‍රියා බොරු කියනවා
 බය නිසාම මම සිංදු කිව්වේ හැමෝටම හොරෙන්
 එයා මගේ සිංදු කියනවා
 අද ඉන්නේ ලැජ්ජ නැති සුපර් ස්ටාර්ලා

20th-century Sri Lankan male singers
Living people
1952 births
People from North Western Province, Sri Lanka
Sinhalese singers
21st-century Sri Lankan male singers